Manley & Mayer was an American architectural firm in Alaska, and was the leading firm in Anchorage for several decades.

History
The firm was established in 1941 by William A. Manley, who had been the Anchorage representative of N. L. Troast & Associates, of Juneau. Manley had been Troast's head draftsman from 1930, had been made a partner by 1935, and came to Anchorage in late 1937. In 1948, Manley added a partner, Francis B. Mayer, a native of Spokane, Washington. Mayer had been with Manley since 1947. Manley & Mayer became the leading firm in Anchorage, and designed many public buildings and schools there and in the surrounding region.  Manley and Mayer remained associated until 1970.

The partners
William A. Manley was born in Washington state in 1904. He was raised in Juneau, where his family had moved in 1913. He studied architecture at the University of Idaho at Moscow, later returning to Juneau. When architect N. Lester Troast moved his office to Juneau from Sitka, Manley was hired as a draftsman. In 1935 he was promoted to partner, the firm becoming N. Lester Troast & Associates. When pioneer Anchorange architect E. Ellsworth Sedille left the state, Troast & Associates opened an office there, with Manley in charge. Troast and Manley separated in 1941, when Troast moved to New Jersey.

Manley established the firm of Manley & Mayer in 1948, with Francis B. Mayer. He retired in 1967, but the partnership remained active until 1970. He died in 1979.

Francis Bernardo Mayer was born in Spokane, Washington in 1914. He joined Manley in 1947, becoming a partner in 1948. He died in 1985.

Legacy
A number of their Anchorage buildings were demolished during the construction boom of the 1980s, which displaced large portions of the city. However, many, especially outside of Anchorage, still have prominent places in their communities.

Selected works

William A. Manley, 1941-1948
 1946 - Central Building, 308 G St, Anchorage, Alaska
 1947 - Loussac-Sogn Building, 425 D St, Anchorage, Alaska, listed on the National Register of Historic Places in 1998 as a rare example of Art Moderne in Anchorage
 1948 - Fairbanks Main School (Addition), 800 Cushman S., Fairbanks, Alaska

Manley & Mayer, 1948-1972
 1949 - Turnagain Arms, 525 W 3rd Ave, Anchorage, Alaska
 1950 - Denali School (former), Lathrop St, Fairbanks, Alaska
 Demolished in 2005.
 1951 - Government Hill Fire Station (former), 921 Hollywood Dr, Anchorage, Alaska
 1952 - Sand Point School, Red Cove Rd, Sand Point, Alaska
 1953 - Sidney Laurence Municipal Auditorium, 621 W 6th Ave, Anchorage, Alaska
 Demolished in 1985.
 1953  - Z. J. Loussac Public Library (former), 555 W 5th Ave, Anchorage, Alaska
 Demolished in 1981.
 1954 - Anchorage High School, Hillcrest Dr, Anchorage, Alaska
 1954 - Woodland Park Elementary School (former), W 36th Ave, Anchorage, Alaska
 Presently occupied as the headquarters of the Boys and Girls Clubs - Alaska.
 1956 - Homer High School, E Fairview Ave, Homer, Alaska
 1956 - Valdez High School, Empire & Sherman Sts, Valdez, Alaska
 Destroyed in the 1964 earthquake.
 1958 - Bunnell Building, University of Alaska, Fairbanks, Alaska
 1958 - Grant Hall, Alaska Pacific University, Anchorage, Alaska
 1960 - East Anchorage High School, E Northern Lights Blvd, Anchorage, Alaska
 1962 - Commerce Building, 441 W 5th Ave, Anchorage, Alaska
 1964 - Atwood Center, Alaska Pacific University, Anchorage, Alaska
 Manley & Mayer served as the local representative of architect Edward Durell Stone, the primary designer.
 1965 - A. J. Dimond High School (Old), W 88th Ave, Anchorage, Alaska
 Demolished in 2005.
 1965 - Seward City Hall, 410 Adams St, Seward, Alaska
 1967 - Elmer E. Rasmuson Library, University of Alaska, Fairbanks, Alaska
 1968 - North Terminal, Anchorage International Airport, Anchorage, Alaska
 1968 - Simpson Building, 645 G St, Anchorage, Alaska
 1969 - Mackay Building Annex, 323 E 4th Ave, Anchorage, Alaska.  McKinley Tower Apartments, in which Marley & Mayer designed post-earthquake renovations, was listed on the National Register of Historic Places in 2008.

Gallery

References

Architecture firms based in Alaska
Companies based in Anchorage, Alaska
Design companies established in 1941
1941 establishments in Alaska
Defunct architecture firms of the United States
Defunct companies based in Alaska